The 1993–94 FC Bayern Munich season was the 94th season in the club's history.  Bayern Munich won its 12th Bundesliga title.

Players

Squad, appearances and goals 

|}

Goals

Bookings

Transfers

In
First Team

Total spending:  €3.9m

Out
First Team

Total income:  €2.825m

Totals

Results

Friendlies

Fuji-Cup

Bundesliga

Results by round

DFB Pokal

UEFA Cup

References

Sources
Soccerbase.com
kicker

FC Bayern Munich seasons
Bayern Munich
German football championship-winning seasons